Yttrium(III) bromide is an inorganic compound with the chemical formula YBr3. It is a white solid. Anhydrous yttrium(III) bromide can be produced by reacting yttrium oxide or yttrium(III) bromide hydrate and ammonium bromide. The reaction proceeds via the intermediate (NH4)3YBr6. Another method is to react yttrium carbide (YC2) and elemental bromine. Yttrium(III) bromide can be reduced by yttrium metal to YBr or Y2Br3.  It can react with osmium to produce Y4Br4Os.

References

Bromides
Metal halides
Yttrium compounds